Cannabis in the Cayman Islands is illegal, but is transported illicitly; limited usage of CBD oil is allowed for medical purposes since 2016.

Counter-drug operations
The Cayman Islands cooperates with the United States Coast Guard to share intelligence on drug trafficking. In 1998, a USCG helicopter radioed information to a Cayman Islands vessel, leading them to intercept a Jamaican fast-boat with 1600lbs of cannabis. In 1995 alone, Cayman seized 2.6 metric tons of cannabis; 742 pounds of that were seized in one operation, found in burlap sacks labeled "brown sugar made in Jamaica".

CBD oil legalization
In 2016, the governor of the British Overseas Territory of the Cayman Islands approved a change to the Misuse of Drugs Law to allow the importation and use of CBD oil for medical purposes.

References

Health in the Cayman Islands
Cayman Islands
Cayman Islands